RnG Muzic is the first collaborative mixtape by American recording artists Kevin McCall and Constantine. It was released January 8, 2015. It is hosted by DJ Carisma and features guest appearances from Gucci Mane, Ken Mailk and Lola Monroe. On January 2, the music video to "CoCo" (Rng Mix) was released and directed by Gold Glass Productions.

Track list

2015 mixtape albums